Labaton Sucharow is an American plaintiffs' law firm. Founded in 1963, the firm employees over 60 lawyers in offices in New York, Delaware, and Washington, D.C. The firm is known for exposing  corporate misconduct and has recovered billions of dollars on behalf of investors and consumers.

History 
Labaton Sucharow was founded in 1963 by Edward Labaton and Lawrence Sucharow. In 2014, The New York Times wrote that Labaton Sucharow was part of "a flourishing industry that pairs plaintiffs' lawyers with state attorneys general to sue companies." The firm has been a donor to state attorneys general associations, candidates, state party committees, and attorneys general running for governor.

Following a Supreme Court decision in 2010, the firm launched its non-U.S. securities litigation practice, which tracks potential or developing cases abroad and counsels  public pension fund on whether and how to get involved. Labaton Sucharow represented several state pension funds in a class action lawsuit against the investment management firm State Street Global Advisors. In 2016, the firm won a $300 million settlement against State Street. That year, The Boston Globe investigated allegations that Labaton Sucharow had inflated hourly bills and that its lawyers had donated money to state pension fund officials. In June 2018, retired federal judge Gerald Ellis Rosen, appointed to investigate the allegations, issued "a scathing 377-page report, accusing the firms of trying to 'jack up' their billable hours" and showing "a troubling disdain for candor and transparency that at times crossed the line to outright concealment of facts.'" Labaton Sucharow agreed to pay $4.8 million to settle the special master's investigation into the firm. The New York Times wrote that the firm's "settlement could prompt greater transparency about so-called finder fees that are paid to lawyers — especially those who do little actual work in a matter" and that the firm's settlement agreement brought "to a close an ugly dispute that shined a spotlight on the kinds of behind-the-scenes deals that plaintiffs' law firms reach with other lawyers to build their case." 

In 2020, U.S. District Judge Mark L. Wolf reduced Labaton Sucharow's fee award in the State Street case by $10 million after finding the firm acted improperly by failing to disclose an agreement to pay a Texas lawyer who introduced the firm to the pension fund that served as the lead plaintiff in the case.

In 2021, French businessman Gerard Sillam and French lawyer Aldric Saulnier claimed that the firm had defrauded them out of fees for introducing Labaton partners to billion-dollar European money-management firms that Labaton sought to represent. In 2022, Labaton Sucharow lost its bid to dismiss the lawsuit when U.S. District Judge Colleen McMahon ruled that Sillam and Saulnier could pursue a "fraudulent inducement" claim against the law firm.

In the last decade, its notable awards include cases against American International Group, Bear Stearns, Massey Energy, Schering-Plough, Federal National Mortgage Association and SCANA. In 2022, the firm and four others won, amounting to $1 billion, the largest stockholder  class cash settlement in Chancery Court history against Dell Technologies founder Michael Dell and other defendants.

References

Privately held companies of the United States
Law firms based in New York City
Law firms established in 1963